The Mountain pine forest (Russian: Горный сосняк на отложениях палеогена) - is a natural monument of Russia (Protected areas of Ulyanovsk Oblast).

Basic features of nature

25 metres high vegetation of pine, linden and birch trees. Bushy flora: cherries, spindle tree, broom, kizilnik, lazurnik. Grassy tier: veynik, lily of the valley, orlyak, pyrethrum.
All forms of fellings, girder and pasturing of cattle are forbidden.
Because of lack of financing researching and scientific work is not conducing.

Bases for creation

Age of 130 years of a natural origin. Nature protection value preservation of ancient pine forests on stony adjournment and rare kinds of a bush.

References
 https://web.archive.org/web/20111224073959/http://eco.ulstu.ru/
 

Protected areas of Russia
Geography of Ulyanovsk Oblast
Forests of Russia